(born Osaka, 8 September 1973), is a former Japanese rugby union player. He played as lock.

Career
Originally from Osaka, Akatsuka was educated at Meiji University and played for Kubota, winning the promotions to Kanto League 3 in 1985, Kanto League 2 in 1991 and Kanto League 1 in 1995. Along with his teammate Hideki Nishida, he was the first Kubota player to play internationally for Japan. Akatsuka was first capped in 1994, during the match against Fiji, at Ehime, on 8 May 1994. He also took part at the 1995 Rugby World Cup, where he played only in the match against New Zealand, in Bloemfontein. After a nine years void, he was called in the Japanese national team by the then-coach Jean-Pierre Élissalde in 2005. Akatsuka last played for Japan against Korea, in Hong Kong, on 25 November 2006.

Notes

External links
Takashi Akatsuka international statistics

1973 births
Living people
Sportspeople from Osaka
Japanese rugby union players
Rugby union locks
Japan international rugby union players
Kubota Spears Funabashi Tokyo Bay players